Juqua Demail Parker (né Thomas; born May 15, 1978) is a former American football defensive end. He was signed by the Tennessee Titans as an undrafted free agent in 2001. He played college football at Oklahoma State and high school football at Aldine High School in Houston, Texas.

Parker has also played for the Philadelphia Eagles and Cleveland Browns.

College career
Parker originally attended Northeastern Oklahoma A&M College where he posted 29 sacks in two seasons and was named Southwestern Junior College Conference Player of the Year.  He then transferred to Oklahoma State, earning third-team All-Big 12 Conference honors and playing in the East-West Shrine Game his senior year after posting 57 tackles, five PBUs, and a team-leading 21 TFLs & 9.5 sacks.

Professional career

Tennessee Titans
Parker signed with the Tennessee Titans as a rookie free agent in 2001 and spent four years as a backup.

Philadelphia Eagles
Parker was signed by the Philadelphia Eagles in 2005 to serve a similar role, and he recorded six sacks in 2006 following an injury to starter Jevon Kearse. In 2007, Parker signed a long-term contract to remain with the team. Midway through the 2007 season he was elevated to the starting lineup to replace an ineffective Kearse and was the team's starting left defensive end. He made a career-high eight sacks in 2008. Parker lost his starting job to 2010 first-round draft pick Brandon Graham midway through the 2010 preseason, however, in the first three games of the season, Parker, in his limited playing time, recorded four sacks.
In 2011, in week 1 against the St. Louis Rams, Parker had a fumble off of Rams quarterback Sam Bradford and returned for a touchdown. In week 15 against the New York Jets, Parker had another fumble returned for a touchdown after Eagles free safety Kurt Coleman stripped the ball from Jets wide receiver Santonio Holmes.

Cleveland Browns
Parker signed with the Cleveland Browns on March 15, 2012.

Personal life

Name change
On March 12, 2008, it was revealed that Juqua's last name had legally been changed from Thomas to Parker at the request of his father, who died in 2005.

Arrest
On August 5, 2009, Parker was taken into custody during a traffic stop around 12:30 a.m. on N. Mountain Drive at Route 378 in Lower Saucon Township, Pennsylvania, which is near the Eagles' training camp at Lehigh University in Bethlehem, Pennsylvania.  Lower Saucon Township police said Parker was a passenger in a vehicle, driven by Eagles' teammate Todd Herremans, which was stopped for a traffic violation, and he had a small amount of marijuana in his possession. Parker, of Medford, New Jersey, was arraigned in the Central Booking Center and released from Northampton County Prison under $1,000 bail.

The charges were dropped after the district attorney ruled that the arresting officer had no right to search the car.

References

External links
Cleveland Browns bio

1978 births
Living people
People from Houston
Players of American football from Texas
American football defensive ends
Oklahoma State Cowboys football players
Tennessee Titans players
Philadelphia Eagles players
Cleveland Browns players
Northeastern Oklahoma A&M Golden Norsemen football players